Baba Meydan-e Zirrah (also Romanized as Bābā Meydān-e Zīrrāh; also known as Bābāmeydān) is a village in Rostam-e Yek Rural District, in the Central District of Rostam County, Fars Province, Iran. At the 2006 census, its population was 1,160, in 247 families.

References 

Populated places in Rostam County